Supaphorn Prompinit (born March 3, 1989, also spelled Suphaphorn Phromphinit) is a retired professional footballer from Thailand.

Honours

Club
Sriracha 
 Thai Division 1 League champions: 2010

Chonburi 
 Kor Royal Cup winner: 2012

External links
 Goal.com
 

1989 births
Living people
Supaphorn Prompinit
Supaphorn Prompinit
Association football midfielders
Supaphorn Prompinit
Supaphorn Prompinit
Supaphorn Prompinit
Supaphorn Prompinit
Supaphorn Prompinit
Supaphorn Prompinit
Supaphorn Prompinit
Supaphorn Prompinit